Auburn Township may refer to:

Arkansas
 Auburn Township, Lincoln County, Arkansas, in Lincoln County, Arkansas

Illinois
 Auburn Township, Clark County, Illinois
 Auburn Township, Sangamon County, Illinois

Iowa
 Auburn Township, Fayette County, Iowa

Kansas
 Auburn Township, Shawnee County, Kansas, in Shawnee County, Kansas

Ohio
 Auburn Township, Crawford County, Ohio
 Auburn Township, Geauga County, Ohio
 Auburn Township, Tuscarawas County, Ohio

Pennsylvania
 Auburn Township, Pennsylvania

Township name disambiguation pages